The PWG World Tag Team Championship is a professional wrestling world tag team  championship owned and copyrighted by the Pro Wrestling Guerrilla (PWG) promotion; it is contested for in their tag team division. The championship was created and debuted on January 25, 2004, at PWG's Tango & Cash Invitational – Night Two event. Originally called the PWG Tag Team Championship, the title was renamed to the PWG World Tag Team Championship in February 2006 after the title was defended outside the United States for the first and second time, when that month then-champions Davey Richards and Super Dragon defeated Cape Fear (El Generico and Quicksilver) in Essen, Germany at European Vacation – Germany and Arrogance (Chris Bosh and Scott Lost) in Orpington, England at European Vacation – England. The championship was later won for the first time outside the United States on October 27, 2007, at PWG's European Vacation II – England event—at that event, then-champions El Generico and Kevin Steen were defeated by Richards and Super Dragon in Portsmouth, England. On June 16, 2017, Penta el Zero M and Rey Fenix successfully defended the title in Ciudad Nezahualcóyotl, Mexico.

Title reigns are determined either by professional wrestling matches between different wrestlers involved in pre-existing scripted feuds and storylines, or by scripted circumstances. Wrestlers are portrayed as either villains or heroes as they follow a series of tension-building events, which culminate in a wrestling match or series of matches for the championship. All title changes happen at live events, which are released on DVD. The inaugural champions were B-Boy and Homicide, whom PWG recognized to have become the champions after defeating The American Dragon and Super Dragon in the finals of the Tango & Cash Invitational Tag Team Tournament on January 25, 2004, at PWG's Tango & Cash Invitational – Night Two event. Super Dragon holds the record for most reigns by a single competitor, with six. PWG publishes a list of successful championship defenses (victories against challengers for the championship) for each champion on their official website, unlike major professional wrestling promotions. At 645 days and counting, the Rascalz (Zachary Wentz and Dezmond Xavier) are the longest reigning champions in their first reign. The Unbreakable F'n Machines' (Brian Cage and Michael Elgin) only reign, Monster Mafia's (Ethan Page and Josh Alexander) only reign and the Beaver Boys' (Alex Reynolds and John Silver) only reign share the record for the shortest in the title's history at less than one day. Overall, there have been 37 reigns, among 40 different wrestlers and 28 different teams, and four vacancies.

Title history

Names

Reigns

Combined reigns

By team

By wrestler

Notes 
1. – Arrogance's reign as a tag team officially began on October 9, but Lost's third reign officially began on September 4.
2. – Though the event "Eleven" started on July 26, 2014, the title change took place after midnight on July 27.
3. – Each reign is ranked highest to lowest; reigns with the exact number mean that they are tied for that certain rank.

References 
 General
 
 Written incorrectly on the site; states PWG Heavyweight Championship, but has the PWG Tag Team Championship history underneath the title.
 

 Specific

External links 
 Pro Wrestling Guerrilla.com

Pro Wrestling Guerrilla championships
Professional wrestling tag team champion lists